Susan Neiman (born March 27, 1955) is an American moral philosopher, cultural commentator, and essayist. She has written extensively on the juncture between Enlightenment moral philosophy, metaphysics, and politics, both for scholarly audiences and the general public. She currently lives in Germany, where she is the Director of the Einstein Forum in Potsdam.

Biography and career
Born and raised in Atlanta, Georgia, Neiman dropped out of high school to join the anti-Vietnam War movement. Later she studied philosophy at Harvard University, earning her Ph.D. under the direction of John Rawls and Stanley Cavell. During graduate school, she spent several years of study at the Free University of Berlin. Slow Fire, a memoir about her life as a Jewish woman in 1980s Berlin, appeared in 1992. From 1989 to 1996 she was an assistant and associate professor of philosophy at Yale University, and from 1996 to 2000 she was an associate professor of philosophy at Tel Aviv University. In 2000 she assumed her current position at the Einstein Forum in Potsdam. She is the mother of three grown children.

Neiman has been a Member of the Institute for Advanced Study in Princeton, New Jersey, a Research Fellow at the Rockefeller Foundation Study Center in Bellagio, and a Senior Fellow of the American Council of Learned Societies. She is now a member of the Berlin-Brandenburg Academy of Sciences and Humanities. Her books have won prizes from PEN, the Association of American Publishers, and the American Academy of Religion. Her shorter pieces have appeared in The New York Times, The Boston Globe, The Globe and Mail, and Dissent. In Germany, she has written for Die Zeit, Frankfurter Allgemeine Zeitung, and Freitag, among other publications. Neiman belongs to a small number of women who have risen to public prominence in the male-dominated field of philosophy.

Major works

Evil in Modern Thought

Evil in Modern Thought writes the history of modern philosophy as a series of responses to the existence of evil – that which, whether in the form of innocent suffering or human action intentionally causing it, "threatens our sense of the sense of the world." Neiman argues that the problem of evil provides a better framework than epistemology for understanding the history of philosophy because it includes a wider range of texts, forms a link between metaphysics and ethics, and is more faithful to philosophers' stated concerns. Indeed, Neiman believes that evil, by challenging the intelligibility of the world as a whole, lies at the root of all philosophical inquiry.

The book explores the period from the early Enlightenment to the late 20th century through discussions of philosophers who often figure in traditional histories of philosophy, such as Leibniz, Kant, Hegel, Nietzsche, and Schopenhauer, as well ones who do not, such as Pierre Bayle, Sigmund Freud, Albert Camus, Emmanuel Levinas, and Hannah Arendt. Neiman groups thinkers around two basic distinctions: one between those who believe in a guiding order beyond appearances and those who think that sensory experience is all we have for orientation; and another between those who believe we must try to understand evil and those who maintain that doing so would be immoral on the grounds that any explanation of evil would be tantamount to its justification.

Moral Clarity

In Moral Clarity, Neiman argues that all human beings have moral needs but that secular culture, particularly on the political left, is reluctant or unable to satisfy them, and as a consequence has ceded the moral domain to religion and traditional conservatives. She attributes this failing not to a lack of values but to a lack of a "standpoint from which those values make sense." The book explores the reasons why this is so and offers a new framework for moral thinking based on Enlightenment ideas, particularly those of Kant and Rousseau, which rely neither on divine authority nor on authoritarian ideology.

Why Grow Up?

In Why Grow Up, Neiman challenges the infantilism that she believes is widespread in modern society. She suggests that the "forces that shape our world" encourage consumerism, apathy, cynicism, and the fetishization of beauty and youth in order to keep citizens passive and compliant. These, she thinks, are propped up by a conception of adulthood in which being an adult is synonymous with drudgery, resignation, and inevitable decline.

Neiman makes the case for an ideal of adulthood that involves exercising judgement, understanding one's own culture through immersion in others, actively shaping society, and seeking orientation in the face of uncertainty. As in Moral Clarity, Neiman draws on the work of Kant, Rousseau, Arendt, and other philosophers to argue for a concept of maturity in which thinking critically does not mean abandoning one's ideals.

Learning from the Germans

Learning from the Germans examines German efforts to atone for Nazi atrocities and identifies lessons for how the U.S. might come to terms with its legacy of slavery and racism. The book brings together historical and philosophical analysis; interviews with politicians, activists, and contemporary witnesses in Germany and the United States; and Neiman's own first-person observations as a white woman growing up in the South and a Jewish woman who has lived for almost three decades in Berlin.

Awards and honors
In 2014 Neiman was the recipient of the International Spinoza Prize and an honorary doctorate from the University of Sankt Gallen. She delivered the Tanner Lectures on Human Values at the University of Michigan in 2010.

In 2018, she was elected to the American Philosophical Society, and received the Lucius D. Clay Medal for her contributions to German-American relations.

Selected bibliography

Books

Learning from the Germans: Race and the Memory of Evil, Farrar, Straus and Giroux, 2019.
Widerstand der Vernunft: Ein Manifest in postfaktischen Zeiten, Ecowin, 2017.
Why Grow Up?, Penguin, 2014 (part of the series Philosophy in Transit). [Reprinted as Why Grow Up? Subversive Thoughts for an Infantile Age, Farrar, Straus & Giroux, 2015.]
Moral Clarity: A Guide for Grown-Up Idealists, Harcourt, 2008.
Fremde sehen anders: Zur Lage der Bundesrepublik, Suhrkamp, 2005.
Evil in Modern Thought: An Alternative History of Philosophy, Princeton University Press, 2002.
The Unity of Reason: Rereading Kant, Oxford University Press, 1994.
Slow Fire: Jewish Notes from Berlin, Schocken, 1992.

Articles and book chapters
"Understanding the Problem of Evil" in Chignell, ed., Evil: Oxford Philosophical Concepts, Oxford University Press, 2019.
"A Dialogue Between Business and Philosophy" (with Bertrand Collomb) in Rangan, ed., Capitalism Beyond Mutuality? Perspectives Integrating Philosophy and Social Science, Oxford University Press, 2018.
"Amerikanische Träume," in Honneth, Kemper, and Klein, ed., Bob Dylan, Suhrkamp, 2017.
"Ideas of Reason," in Rangan, ed., Performance and Progress: Essays on Capitalism, Business, and Society, Oxford University Press, 2015.
"Forgetting Hiroshima, Remembering Auschwitz: Tales of Two Exhibits," Thesis Eleven, 129(1), 2015: 7–26.
"Victims and Heroes," in Matheson, ed., The Tanner Lectures on Human Values, University of Utah Press, 2012.
"Subversive Einstein," in Galison, Holton and Schweber, ed., Einstein for the 21st Century, Princeton University Press, 2008.

Newspaper and magazine articles
"The True Left Is Not Woke" UnHerd, 2023.
"There Are No Nostalgic Nazi Memorials," The Atlantic, 2019.
"Working Off the Past, from Atlanta to Berlin," The New York Review of Books, 2019.
"Germany paid Holocaust Reparations. Will the U.S. Do the Same for Slavery?" Los Angeles Times, 2019.
"The President of Our Country is Evil," Salon, 2017.
"In Germany, Monuments Reflect the Nation's Values," Miami Herald, 2017.
"Die Deutschen sollten keine Angst haben," Frankfurter Allgemeine Zeitung, 2016. 
"What Americans Abroad Know about Bernie Sanders," Los Angeles Times, 2016.
"An Enlightenment for Grownups," Spiked Review, 2016.
"Antimodernismus: Die Quelle allen Unglücks?" Die Zeit, 2016.
"Deutschland hat sich positiv verändert. Das beglückt mich," Die Zeit, 2016. 
"Aufklärung heißt nicht, nur nach mehr Toleranz zu rufen!" Der Tagesspiegel, 2016. 
"The Rationality of the World: A Philosophical Reading of the Book of Job," ABC Religion and Ethics, 2016.
"Hört auf, Antisemiten zu zählen!" Die Zeit, 2014.
"History and Guilt," Aeon, 2013.
"Was ist Religion?" Die Zeit, 2013.
"What It All Means," The New York Times, 2011.
"Is Morality Driven by Faith?" The Washington Post/Newsweek, 2008.

References

External links

Official Website Provides biography along with publications and appearances.
Einstein Forum Profile
Interview about Learning from the Germans with Christiane Amanpour, CNN (September 19, 2019).
Discussion of Learning from the Germans, The Guardian (September 13, 2019).  
Discussion of Learning from the Germans with Robert Siegel, Moment (August 27, 2019).
 Review of Moral Clarity: A Guide for Grown-Up Idealists, Prabuddha Bharata, October, 2017 by Subhasis Chattopadhyay.
 Review of Evil in Modern Thought: An Alternative History of Philosophy, Prabuddha Bharata, Special Tantra Issue, January, 2016 by Subhasis Chattopadhyay. 
Review of Why Grow Up?, The New York Times Sunday Book Review (June 21, 2015).
Review of Why Grow Up, Harvard Magazine (May–June 2015).
Review of Why Grow Up?, The Guardian (January 2, 2015).
Interview in The New Statesman (February 1, 2010).
Review of Moral Clarity in Slate Magazine.
Guardian.co.uk Review of Moral Clarity in The Guardian (July 25, 2009).
Making Progress: Rethinking Enlightenment Lecture, RSA (July 1, 2009).
Roundtable Discussion Progressive Book Club (July 2008).
On Religion and Reason Video for Big Think (Uploaded June 5, 2008).
Interview Tavis Smiley Show, PBS (May 13, 2008).
Lecture at "Beyond Belief," Conference at the Salk Institute, La Jolla, CA (November 6, 2006).
Interview for NOW with Bill Moyers, PBS (January 2, 2004).

1955 births
Living people
Harvard University alumni
Yale University faculty
Academic staff of Tel Aviv University
Jewish American writers
21st-century American philosophers
American women philosophers
Jewish women writers
Members of the American Philosophical Society
American essayists
21st-century American Jews
21st-century American women